is a Japanese judoka.

He was born in Iyo, Ehime, and began judo at the age of 6. He entered the Kanagawa Prefectural Police after graduating from Tokai University.

He was good at Seoinage and got medals of world championships twice. He was also known as a rival of three-time Olympic champion Tadahiro Nomura for long time.

As of 2010, he coaches judo at Komatsu Limited and among his students are Mika Sugimoto, Ayumi Tanimoto, and Mina Watanabe.

References

Japanese male judoka
1974 births
Living people
Tokai University alumni
People from Iyo, Ehime
Sportspeople from Ehime Prefecture
Asian Games medalists in judo
Judoka at the 1998 Asian Games
Asian Games gold medalists for Japan
Medalists at the 1998 Asian Games
20th-century Japanese people
21st-century Japanese people